Gedai (also Romanized as Gedā'ī and Gedāy) is a village in Chaybasar-e Shomali Rural District, Bazargan District, Maku County, West Azerbaijan Province, Iran. At the 2006 census, its population was 71, in 12 families.

References 

Populated places in Maku County